Dutch John is a town located in eastern Daggett County, Utah, United States, approximately  northeast of the Flaming Gorge Dam on U.S. Route 191. The population was 145 at the 2010 census.

History
The town (but a census-designated place before 2016) was platted and constructed beginning in 1957 by the United States Bureau of Reclamation to house workers working on the construction of Flaming Gorge Dam. After the dam's completion in 1964, Dutch John became home to a smaller number of dam maintenance and operations personnel, as well as employees of the National Park Service and United States Forest Service.

The Dutch John townsite and its buildings continued to be owned by the Bureau of Reclamation until 1998 when the town was privatized. Buildings were sold to individual landowners, and undeveloped land in the town was transferred to Daggett County. The county later completed a master plan for the Dutch John townsite and has begun offering parcels of land for sale to developers.

The fire caused damage to power transmission lines which were supported by wooden poles.

During the peak years of construction activity at Flaming Gorge Dam, as many as 3,500 people lived in Dutch John.

In November 2014, the residents of Dutch John voted overwhelmingly to incorporate into a town. An election was held in June 2015, in which William Rogers was elected mayor; Ryan Kelly, Sandy Kunkel, Harriet Dickerson, and Dave MacDonald were elected as members of the Town Council. They took office, and the incorporation became official in January 2016. In the town's 2021 election, Sandy Kunkel was elected as mayor.

A resort within the town is host to the world's largest fishing fly. It is over three tons in weight and is over 32 feet long.

Demographics

As of the census of 2010, there were 145 people living in the CDP. There were 105 housing units. The racial makeup of the town was 97.2% White, 0.7% American Indian and Alaska Native, 1.4% Asian, and 0.7% from two or more races. Hispanic or Latino of any race was 1.4% of the population.

Climate
Large seasonal temperature differences typify this climatic region, with warm to hot (and often humid) summers and cold (sometimes severely cold) winters.  According to the Köppen Climate Classification system, Dutch John has a humid continental climate, abbreviated "Dfb" on climate maps.

See also

 List of cities and towns in Utah

References

External links

 Daggett County, Utah -- Dutch John
 2001 General Plan:  Community of Dutch John (PDF)

Towns in Daggett County, Utah
Towns in Utah
Populated places established in 1957